Blanzac is the name or part of the name of the following communes in France:

 Blanzac, Haute-Loire, in the Haute-Loire department
 Blanzac, Haute-Vienne, in the Haute-Vienne department
 Blanzac-lès-Matha, in the Charente-Maritime department
 Blanzac-Porcheresse, in the Charente department